Ipiaú is a city in Bahia, Brazil.

The city is located at the confluence of the Contas River and the Água-Branca River (White-water River).

Ipiaú is bordered, in counterclockwise fashion, by Ibirataia and Jequié to the north, Aiquara and Jitaúna to the west, Ibirataia and Barra do Rocha to the east and Itagibá to the south.

The city is an important producer and exporter of cacao in Brazil.

Is the birthplace of many noted Brazilian, writers and musicians, including Euclides Neto and Luiz Caldas.

References

Municipalities in Bahia